Emma Ovelius is a Swedish world champion bridge player.

Bridge accomplishments

Wins 
 Venice Cup (2) 2019, 2022

Runners-up 
 Venice Cup (1) 2017

References

External links 
 

Living people
Year of birth missing (living people)
Swedish contract bridge players